Luodian County is a county under the administration of Qiannan Buyei and Miao Autonomous Prefecture in the south of Guizhou province, China, bordering Guangxi to the south.

The climate in the area is humid subtropical, with strong monsoon influences bringing heavy rain during the summer. Winters are dry due to the influence of the Siberian high-pressure system.

The county seat and the largest town in the county is also named Luodian; it was formerly known as Longping.

The county is frequented by both Chinese and foreign geologists, with the core area of work called Big Guizhoutan, or Big Guizhou Shoal.  This has been called a "treasure land for Triassic Period research."

History

In 629, the Tang dynasty put Le'an County (now Luodian) under the jurisdiction of Zhuangzhou.

Luodian was the seat of the Yi-speaking Luodian Kingdom in the 9th century.

In 1292, Yuan dynasty set up Yuanfu, Le'an County was renamed Luobo County, and was put under its jurisdiction.

During the Ming dynasty, Luodian County was affiliated to the Luoboguan Inspection Department of Xilongzhou, Guangxi Province.

In the Qing dynasty, in 1727, Yongfeng Prefecture was set up, and the Luoju Court (now Luodian) was within the territory.

In 1749, Luojing Prefecture was renamed to the Prefecture of Fanzhou and was transferred to Guiyang Prefecture.

In 1913, Luojing was under the jurisdiction of Yuzhong Circuit (in Guiyang). In 1914, Luojing was set up as a county of Guizhou Province.

On March 23, 1951, Luodian was under PRC control, and the next day the Luodian County People's Government was established.

Climate

References

External links 
Li Wei-huang, "The Moon above Guizhou", Tzu Chi Quarterly, Spring 2001
Hsu Hsi-man, "Guizhou: Into the Light, Tzu Chi Quarterly, Summer 2004
"China - Travel diary 2001, An Adventure to Guizhou Province", tribaltextiles.info

County-level divisions of Guizhou
Qiannan Buyei and Miao Autonomous Prefecture